Piyari Bittu, is a Pakistani television drama serial, written by Saji Gul, directed by Mazhar Moin and aired on Express Entertainment in 2017-18. It features Saniya Shamshad in the titular role of Bittu while  Atiqa Odho and Sania Saeed in leading roles in their second project together after 25 years. The serial sheds light on Alzheimer's disease and explains the complexity of human relations.

Plot 
Shakra loves her nice Bittu very much who suffers from Alzheimer's disease. Bittu's father is also very ill and is on his deathbed. Bittu's mother, Sakina is very clever and has greedy nature who does nothing expect to pray for the death of her husband. Before his death, Bittu's father takes promise from his sister Shakara that she will takes care of Bittu after him. After his death, Sakina marries with another man and takes Bittu with her. She then marries Bittu with a pshyco man in return of heavy amount. When Shakra finds it she goes and brings Bittu back to her. She sacrifices her all happiness for Bittu and even ignores her husband and children without knowing that in near future all of her sacrifices will cause troubles for him.

Cast 
 Saniya Shamshad as Bittu
 Sania Saeed as Shakra
 Atiqa Odho as Shakila
 Farah Shah as Rukhsana
 Nayyar Ejaz as Bittu's father
 Rashid Farooqui as Mushtaq
 Fawad Khan as Mehboob
 Kaif Ghaznavi as Shazia
 Tipu Sharif as Shahid
 Shamim Hilaly
 Zaib Rehman

Production 
The series marked the collaboration of Saeed and Odho after 25 years, previously appeared in Anwar Maqsood's Sitara Aur Mehrunnisa in 1992. About their casting, the director Mazhar Moin stated, "The casting of Atiqa and Sania together just happened by chance, Atiqa has worked with me earlier too, but after we had decided Atiqa would play Bitto’s mother, Saniya seemed the perfect choice for playing Shakira. When Sania agreed to the role, we realised that they would be working together after such a long time."

Reception
Piyari Bittu received mixed reviews, critics criticised its slow pace and distracted storyline of the concluding episodes and praised the subject and acting performances of the cast.

References 

Pakistani drama television series
2017 Pakistani television series debuts